The Odyssey 30 is an American sailboat, that was designed by Carl Alberg and first built in 1960 in the San Francisco bay area. A total of 15 examples were completed.

Many of the design elements of the Odyssey 30 were used in the Alberg 30 of 1962.

The design is often confused with a different boat with the same name, the George Cuthbertson-designed 1987 Odyssey 30.

Design
The Odyssey 30 is a small recreational keelboat, built predominantly of fiberglass, with wood trim. It has a fractional sloop and a fixed fin keel. It displaces  and carries  of ballast.

See also
List of sailing boat types

Similar sailboats
Annie 30
Bahama 30
Bristol 29.9
Catalina 30
Catalina 309
C&C 30
C&C 30 Redwing
CS 30
Grampian 30
Hunter 30
Hunter 30T
Hunter 30-2
Hunter 306
Leigh 30
Mirage 30
Nonsuch 30
O'Day 30
Pearson 303
S2 9.2
Southern Cross 28

References

Keelboats
1960s sailboat type designs
Sailing yachts
Sailboat type designs by Carl Alberg